Filip Jergović (Филип Јерговић) was the Minister of Finance of the Kingdom of Montenegro from September 1910 to June 1912, being succeeded by Sekula Drljević. He was educated in Zagreb and Vienna.

References

Government ministers of Montenegro
Finance ministers of Montenegro
People of the Kingdom of Montenegro